Tyler Mosienko (born March 21, 1984) is a Canadian professional ice hockey player who is currently an unrestricted free agent. He most recently played for the Iowa Heartlanders in the ECHL. He is the grandson of Hockey Hall of Famer Bill Mosienko.

Playing career
On July 25, 2014, he joined the Sheffield Steelers of the Elite Ice Hockey League on a one-year contract after helping the Alaska Aces claim their third ECHL Kelly Cup championship. He remained until November 2016 when he left to join the Frederikshavn White Hawks of the Metal Ligaen in Denmark.

After spending time with the Saale Bulls Halle of the Oberliga in Germany, Mosienko decided to return for his 16th professional season after a years hiatus and signed with inaugural ECHL club, Iowa Heartlanders, on October 23, 2021.

Career statistics

References

External links

1984 births
Living people
Alaska Aces (ECHL) players
Bridgeport Sound Tigers players
Canadian ice hockey centres
Dauphins d'Épinal players
EfB Ishockey players
Esbjerg Energy players
Frederikshavn White Hawks players
Greenville Grrrowl players
Iowa Heartlanders players
Kelowna Rockets players
Las Vegas Wranglers players
Manchester Monarchs (AHL) players
Nippon Paper Cranes players
Rockford IceHogs (AHL) players
Saale Bulls Halle players
San Antonio Rampage players
Thomas Sabo Ice Tigers players
Sheffield Steelers players
Canadian expatriate ice hockey players in England
Canadian expatriate ice hockey players in Germany